Estover may refer to:

Estovers, an English legal term
Estover, Plymouth, a housing estate in Devon, England 
Tor Bridge High, formerly Estover Community College, Devon, England